Movistar Plus+ (formerly Movistar+) is the trade name of the subscription platform for digital television owned by Telefónica, which operates in Spain. The service is distributed via optical fiber and ADSL as well as with satellites such as Astra. The platform, which was officially launched on July 8, 2015, stems from the merger of Canal+ and Movistar TV. It is the largest subscription television provider in Spain with 3,7 million customers and 45% of market share.

History

In 2013, even though they had previously happened during 2008, some negotiations about Canal+ sale appeared again. These ones would be more real because of the hurry banks had to solve PRISA's debt to them.

In June 2014, Prisa accepted Telefónica's offer to own Canal+. One month later, Mediaset España would sell its share to Telefónica so it could obtain the 100% of the company.

On 8 July  2015, Telefónica launched Movistar+, a new platform from the merger of Canal+ and Movistar TV which involved changes in the packages and new channels in both platforms.

It is a Pay-TV platform in Spain, owned by Telefónica. The platform, which broadcasts via cable and satellite, was officially launched on July 8, 2015 and stems from the merger of Canal+ (satellite) and Movistar TV (IPTV) platforms.

Currently the subscription television platform, with more subscribers in Spain.

Since 2013, various news regarding the possible purchase of Canal + were published by Telefónica for PRISA could eliminate some of its debt. According to media reports, there were also many companies that wanted to buy the Pay-TV platform, as Al Jazeera, Vivendi and Liberty Global mogul Rupert Murdoch. However, this sale had no media coverage and it seemed that the negotiations and bids They lengthen much.

On May 6, 2014, Telefónica submitted a binding to gain 56% PRISA had in Canal +, in exchange for paying about 725 million offer euros. The next day, the media echoed the acceptance of PRISA were made. The seller stated that "for a period of thirty days," since then negotiate with the buyer to continue the buying process, which would be regulated and reviewed by the CNMC and Brussels, that there was no monopoly or establish a negative conditions for competency. Closing of this sale is subject to obtaining the necessary authorization from the competition authorities and approval by a representative panel of banks financing PRISA.

The June 18, 2014, Telefónica submitted a binding offer to acquire 295 million euros for 22% of Canal+ in the hands of Mediaset Spain.

On July 4, 2014, Mediaset Spain accepted the offer to purchase 22% of Canal+ Telefónica.

The April 22, 2015, the CNMC gave its approval to the sale of Canal+ to Telefónica. After this, Canal + began the process of merger with Movistar TV the July 7, 2015, which resulted in Movistar+.

In June 2019, an over-the-top video streaming service was launched under the brand Movistar+ Lite. It features select content but not LaLiga football matches or cinema and series exclusives.

Channels operated by Movistar+ 

Generalists
 #0 por Movistar Plus+
 #Vamos por Movistar Plus+
Series
 Series por Movistar Plus+
 Series 2 por Movistar Plus+
 Fest por Movistar Plus+
Movies
 Estrenos por Movistar Plus+
 Estrenos 2 por Movistar Plus+
 Clásicos por Movistar Plus+
 Acción por Movistar Plus+
 Comedia por Movistar Plus+
 Drama por Movistar Plus+
 Cine Español por Movistar Plus+

Football
 LaLiga por Movistar Plus+
 Liga de Campeones por Movistar Plus+
 Fútbol Replay
Sports
 Deportes por Movistar Plus+
 Golf por Movistar Plus+
 Caza y Pesca
 Toros

 All channels but Fútbol Replay are broadcast in HD on fiber.
 All channels but Fútbol Replay and Cine Español por Movistar Plus+ have an HD feed available on satellite.
 All channels are broadcast in SD on ADSL.
 LaLiga por Movistar Plus+ and Liga de Campeones por Movistar Plus+ have a 4K feed on fiber for broadcasting selected La Liga and Champions League matches.

References

External links
 
 How and what to watch

 
Telefónica
Television networks in Spain
Direct broadcast satellite services